Labour Administration Convention, 1978 is  an International Labour Organization Convention.

It was established in 1978, with the preamble stating:

Having decided upon the adoption of certain proposals with regard to labour administration: role, functions and organisation, ...

Ratifications
As of 2022, the convention has been ratified by 78 states.

External links 
Text.
Ratifications.

International Labour Organization conventions
Treaties concluded in 1978
Treaties entered into force in 1980
Treaties of Albania
Treaties of Algeria
Treaties of Antigua and Barbuda
Treaties of Argentina
Treaties of Armenia
Treaties of Australia
Treaties of Belarus
Treaties of Belgium
Treaties of Belize
Treaties of Benin
Treaties of Burkina Faso
Treaties of Cambodia
Treaties of the Central African Republic
Treaties of the People's Republic of China
Treaties of the Republic of the Congo
Treaties of Zaire
Treaties of Costa Rica
Treaties of Cuba
Treaties of Cyprus
Treaties of the Czech Republic
Treaties of Denmark
Treaties of Dominica
Treaties of the Dominican Republic
Treaties of Egypt
Treaties of El Salvador
Treaties of Finland
Treaties of West Germany
Treaties of Gabon
Treaties of Ghana
Treaties of Greece
Treaties of Guinea
Treaties of Guyana
Treaties of Ba'athist Iraq
Treaties of Israel
Treaties of Italy
Treaties of Ivory Coast
Treaties of Jamaica
Treaties of Jordan
Treaties of South Korea
Treaties of Kyrgyzstan
Treaties of Latvia
Treaties of Lebanon
Treaties of Lesotho
Treaties of Liberia
Treaties of Luxembourg
Treaties of North Macedonia
Treaties of Malawi
Treaties of Mali
Treaties of Mauritius
Treaties of Mexico
Treaties of Moldova
Treaties of Morocco
Treaties of Namibia
Treaties of the Netherlands
Treaties of Niger
Treaties of Norway
Treaties of Portugal
Treaties of Romania
Treaties of Russia
Treaties of Rwanda
Treaties of San Marino
Treaties of Serbia
Treaties of Seychelles
Treaties of Sierra Leone
Treaties of Spain
Treaties of Suriname
Treaties of Sweden
Treaties of Switzerland
Treaties of Togo
Treaties of Trinidad and Tobago
Treaties of Tunisia
Treaties of Ukraine
Treaties of the United Kingdom
Treaties of the United States
Treaties of Uruguay
Treaties of Venezuela
Treaties of Zambia
Treaties of Zimbabwe
Treaties extended to Guernsey
Treaties extended to the Isle of Man
Treaties extended to Gibraltar
Treaties extended to Montserrat
Treaties extended to Macau
1978 in labor relations